Aulacophora hilaris, also known as Pumpkin Beetle, is a beetle in the genus Aulacophora that is found in Australia.

Description 
Like other beetles in the genus Aulacophora, Aulacophora hilaris is black and orange and has a length of 6 mm - 7 mm.

Distribution 
Aulacophora hilaris is found in Eastern Australia, including in the Sydney area.

As a pest 
Aulacophora hilaris is considered a pest as it feeds on members of the family Cucurbitaceae, which includes cucumbers and pumpkins hence its common name.

References 

hilaris
Beetles of Australia
Agricultural pest insects
Beetles described in 1835